Alstonia scholaris, commonly called blackboard tree, Scholar Tree, Milkwood or devil's tree in English, is an evergreen tropical tree in the Dogbane Family (Apocynaceae). It is native to southern China, tropical Asia (mainly the Indian subcontinent and Southeast Asia）and Australasia, where it is a common ornamental plant. It is a toxic plant, but is used traditionally for myriad diseases and complaints.

Description
Its mature bark is grayish and its young branches are copiously marked with lenticels.One unique feature of this tree is that in some places, such as New Guinea, the trunk is three-sided (i.e. it is triangular in cross-section).

The upper side of the leaves are glossy, while the underside is greyish. Pedicels are usually as long as or shorter than calyx. The corolla is white and tube-like, ; lobes are broadly ovate or broadly obovate, overlapping to the left. The ovaries are distinct and pubescent. The follicles are distinct and linear.

Flowers bloom in the month October. The flowers are very fragrant similar to the flower of Cestrum nocturnum.

Seeds of A. scholaris are oblong, with ciliated margins, and ends with tufts of hairs . The bark is almost odorless and very bitter, with abundant bitter and milky sap.

Distribution
Alstonia scholaris is native to the following regions:

 China: Guangxi, Yunnan
 Indian subcontinent: Bangladesh, India, Nepal, Pakistan, Sri Lanka
 Southeast Asia: Cambodia, Laos, Indonesia, Malaysia, Myanmar, Papua New Guinea, Philippines, Thailand, Vietnam 
 Australia: Queensland

Alstonia scholaris is the state tree of West Bengal, India, where it is called Chhatim tree.

Toxicity
This is a toxic plant. At high doses, an extract of the plant exhibited marked damage to all the major organs of the body in both rats and mice. The toxicity appears to depend on the plant organ studied, as well as the season it is harvested, with the bark collected in the monsoon season being the least toxic, and bark in the summer the most. Intraperitoneal administration is much more toxic than oral. Rats were more susceptible to the poison than mice, and pure-bred mice strains were more susceptible than crossbred. The toxic effects may be due to the echitamine content of the bark, an alkaloid.

Uses

The wood of Alstonia scholaris has been recommended for the manufacture of pencils, as it is suitable in nature and the tree grows rapidly and is easy to cultivate. In Sri Lanka its light wood was used for coffins. The wood close to the root is very light and of white colour, and in Borneo was used for net floats, household utensils, trenchers, corks, etc. In Theravada Buddhism, the first Buddha is said to have used Alstonia scholaris as the tree for achieving enlightenment.

The 1889 book The Useful Native Plants of Australia states that "the powerfully bitter bark of this tree is used by the natives of India in bowel complaints (Treasury of Botany). It has proved a valuable remedy in chronic diarrhoea and the advanced stages of dysentery. It has also been found effectual in restoring the tone of the stomach and of the system generally in debility after fevers and other exhausting diseases (Pharmacopoeia of India). It is described in the Pharmacopoeia of India as an astringent tonic, anthelmintic, and antiperiodic. It is held in the highest repute in the Phillippine Islands [sic]." Despite its widespread traditional use as an 'antiperiodic' (a medicine which was supposed to cure the effects of malaria), however, it was found to have little to very weak activity against Plasmodium falciparum. It had no effect against Giardia intestinalis, and weak effect against Entamoeba histolytica, which both cause diarrhoea.

During convocation the leaves of Alstonia scholaris (saptaparni) are awarded to graduates and postgraduates of Visva-Bharati University by the chancellor, given to him in turn by the Prime Minister of India. In recent years, supposedly to prevent excessive damage to environment, the vice chancellor of the University accepts one saptaparni leaf from the chancellor on behalf of all the students. This tradition was initiated by the founder of the University, Rabindranath Tagore.

At one time, decoctions of the leaves were used for beriberi.

Chemistry
The bark contains the alkaloids ditamine, echitenine, echitamine and strictamine. Echitamine is the most important alkaloid found in the bark, as it has been detected in all samples studied and collected from several locations, and which is commercially sold as herbal medicine.

References

scholaris
Flora of Guangxi
Flora of Yunnan
Flora of tropical Asia
Trees of Australia
Gentianales of Australia
Flora of Queensland
Least concern flora of Australia
Least concern biota of Queensland
Symbols of West Bengal